Perr Schuurs (born 26 November 1999) is a Dutch professional footballer who plays as a centre-back for  club Torino.

Club career
Schuurs made his senior league debut for Sittard on 14 October 2016 in an Eerste Divisie 2–0 home win against VVV-Venlo. He scored his first goal on 6 February 2017 in Fortuna's 5–2 home victory over Jong Ajax.

For the 2017–18 season, Schuurs, aged 17, was made captain of Fortuna Sittard. In January 2018, Schuurs became a player of Ajax, who sent him back on loan to Fortuna Sittard for the remainder of the season. On 7 October 2018, Schuurs made his Eredivisie debut, as a substitute, for Ajax in a 5–0 win against AZ.

Schuurs transferred to Italian club Torino in August 2022.

International career
Schuurs was called up to the senior Netherlands squad for the UEFA Nations League matches against Poland and Italy in September 2020.

Personal life
Schuurs is a son of former Dutch international handball player Lambert Schuurs and his sister Demi is a professional tennis player.

Career statistics

Club

Honours 
Ajax
 Eredivisie: 2018–19, 2020–21, 2021–22
 KNVB Cup: 2018–19, 2020–21
 Johan Cruyff Shield: 2019

Individual
UEFA European Under-21 Championship Team of the Tournament: 2021

References

External links
 
 Career stats - Voetbal International

1999 births
Living people
People from Echt-Susteren
Dutch footballers
Footballers from Limburg (Netherlands)
Association football central defenders
Netherlands under-21 international footballers
Netherlands youth international footballers
Eredivisie players
Eerste Divisie players
Serie A players
Fortuna Sittard players
AFC Ajax players
Jong Ajax players
Torino F.C. players
Dutch expatriate footballers
Dutch expatriate sportspeople in Italy
Expatriate footballers in Italy